(born October 19, 1971) is a former Japanese idol. She is featured in the video game Risa no Yōsei Densetsu.

Filmography

References

External links 
 

1971 births
Japanese actresses
Japanese idols
Japanese women pop singers
Living people
People from Osaka
Musicians from Osaka Prefecture
Place of birth missing (living people)
21st-century Japanese singers
21st-century Japanese women singers